The Parkrose School District is in Portland, Oregon.  The district contains four elementary schools, a middle school, and a high school.  It is a K–12 district with an enrollment of approximately 3,300 students .

History
The school district originated in 1885 as a one-room schoolhouse, though the district's name at that time was informal.  The district slowly grew - first into several classrooms, and later several buildings. In November 2005 the school district had 3,505 students enrolled.

Demographics
In the 2009 school year, the district had 199 students classified as homeless by the Department of Education, or 5.6% of students in the district.

Schools
Parkrose High School, Molly Ouche, Principal
Parkrose Middle School, Annette Sweeney, Principal 
Sacramento Elementary, Megan Filiault, Principal 
Russell Elementary, Samantha Regaisus, Principal
Shaver Elementary, Laura Goodman, Principal
Prescott Elementary, Sam Maranto, Principal

See also
List of school districts in Oregon

References

External links
Parkrose school district website

1885 establishments in Oregon
Education in Portland, Oregon
School districts established in 1885
School districts in Oregon
Parkrose, Portland, Oregon